Capo d'Anzio Lighthouse is an active lighthouse located on the same name Cape on a rocky cliff overlooking the ruins of Nero's villa, close to the town of Anzio, Lazio on the Tyrrhenian Sea.

Description
The construction of the lighthouse began in 1860 by the will of Pope Pius IX but the works ended six years later, in 1866, as it is remembered in a plaque outside the building. The lighthouse is completely automated and operated by the Marina Militare with the identification code number 2246 E.F.

See also
 List of lighthouses in Italy
 Anzio

References

External links

 Servizio Fari Marina Militare 

Lighthouses in Italy